The National Development Planning Commission  is a Ghanaian state agency committed to eradicating poverty and reducing inequalities in deprived areas and rural communities. The commission was established in 1992.

History 

The establishment of a National Development Commission was first proposed under the 1979 constitution. According to the constitution, the commission was to be chaired by the then vice president who was to report to the then president. The role of the chairman of the Commission according to the constitution was to advise, monitor and evaluate. The commission's existence was precluded by the 1981 coup.

In view of Ghana's attempt to improve decentralization in the 1980s, the government employed the services of a Hungarian team of consultants (TESCO), sponsored by the United Nations Development Programme (UNDP). The team was to study the nation and propose a structure of development planning based on grassroots participation. In March 1987, the resulting proposal from the team was considered and based on this proposal, they decided to establish a development planning agency that was to be independent of the Ministry of Finance and Economic Planning.

The National Development Planning Commission was established, and a preparatory committee by the name Transitional Implementation Team (TIT) was created to put together a detailed proposal on how the commission should be organized and structured. The team also prepared an operating manual and a draft, National Development Planning Law, which was going to be the commission's legal basis.

Following the creation of the National Development Planning Law, the drafted legal document was revised a number of times until 1989 when it was accepted. The government in early 1990 begun to implement the recommendations of the Transitional Implementation Team (TIT), and the preparatory committee by (PREPCOM) for the establishment of the National Development Planning Commission was established. The committee was chaired by Lieutenant-General Arnold Quainoo, then member of the PNDC government, and the committee began operations on 2 April 1990.

1n 1993 when Ghana transitioned from military rule to civilian rule, the legitimacy of the committee was backed by article 86 of the 1992 constitution. The establishment of the committee was formalised by article 87, which described and explained the functions of the commission, including its mandate to "advise the president on development planning policy and strategy".

Lieutenant-Colonel Mensah K. Gbedemah who had served as the preparatory commission's secretary from February 1991 to June 1994, was later appointed technical head of the National Development Planning Commission (NDPC). He was replaced by Dr. Kobena G. Erbynn who served from June 1994 to February 1995.

In accordance to the 1992 constitution, the National Development Planning Commission (NDPC) act, act 479, was promulgated in September 1994. Based on the act, a governing board for the commission was set up in February 1995. The first group of members of the commission were sworn in by the then president, Jerry John Rawlings at the Osu Castle (the then residence of the president of Ghana) on 15 June 1995.

Some of the then leading members of the commission included, P. V. Obeng (Presidential Advisor on Government Affairs) who was then vice-chairman; Dr. Kobena G. Erbynn, then acting Director-General of the NDPC, and Lieutenant-General Arnold Quainoo, who continued to serve on the commission.

Mandate 
The NDPC, as a Ghanaian state agency, was established solely to work closely with every President of the Fourth republic of Ghana. The commission is mandated to make provisions for coordinated program of Economic and Social Development policies, which the President of Ghana under the constitution is required to submit to parliament within two years.

The NDPC was set up under Articles 86 and 87 of the 1992 constitution of Ghana. Article 86 of the constitution stipulates the composition of the commission whereas Article 87 outlines the functions of the commission. The National Development Planning Act, 1994, (Act 479), formally establishes the NDPC under the office of the President. And the National Development Planning (System), Act, 1994, (Act 480) makes NDPC the national coordinating body of the newly established Decentralized Development Planning System in Ghana. These provisions lay out the core legal framework of the commission. To promote sustainable and stable development to eliminate poverty, reduce inequalities in deprived areas and improve people's quality of life.

Laws and Functions 
Laws relevant to the functions of the commission are Local Government Act (Act 462) 1993; Local Government Service Act (Act 656) 2003; Petroleum Revenue Act (Act 815) 2011; Civil Service Act (PNDC Law 327) 1993; and Ghana Infrastructure Investment Fund Act, (Act 877) 2014.

The major function of the NDPC is to advise the President on economic development. As part of its functions to produce a National Development Plan, the commission initiated the process of producing Vision 2020, a 25-year development plan. Vision 2020: The First Step (1996-2000) covered the initial part of the plan. The commission also led in creating other medium-term plans such as Ghana Poverty Reduction Strategy (2003-2005); Growth and Poverty Reduction Strategy (2006-2009); Ghana shared Growth and Development Agenda (2010-2013), and Ghana Shared Growth and Development Agenda (2014-2017).

Per the constitution of Ghana, the commission is expected to perform these functions:

 "The Commission shall advise the President on development planning policy and strategy."
 "The Commission shall, at the request of the President or Parliament, or on its own initiative- (a) study and make strategic analyses of macro-economic and structural reform options; (b) make proposals for the development of multi-year rolling plans taking into consideration the resource potential and comparative advantage of the different districts in Ghana; (c) make proposals for the protection of the natural and physical environment; (d) make proposals for ensuring the even development of the districts of Ghana by the effective utilization of available resources; and (e) monitor, evaluate and co-ordinate development policies, programs and projects."
 "The commission shall also perform such other functions relating to development planning as the President may direct."

References 

Government of Ghana
Development in Africa
Parliament of Ghana